The Safran Ardiden is a  turboshaft designed and produced by Safran Helicopter Engines for  single and twin-engine helicopters.

Launched in 2003 as a more powerful TM 333, it first ran in 2005 and was introduced in 2007.

The Ardiden 1 Shakti powers the Indian HAL Dhruv, Light Combat Helicopter and Light Utility Helicopter  while the more powerful Ardiden 3 powers the Avicopter AC352 and Kamov Ka-62.

Development

In 1961, Turbomeca granted Hindustan Aeronautics (HAL) a manufacturing license for the Artouste turboshaft engine to equip the Indian Alouette III Chetak and Alouette II Cheetah helicopters.

By January 2002, Turbomeca had begun developing the  Ardiden TM3332C2 for  helicopters, launched at the Paris Air Show for the LAH as the Shakti, co-developed and assembled by HAL, as the US lifted India's 1998 nuclear tests sanctions.
The TM3332B2 first two axial stages were replaced by a centrifugal compressor, and the power turbine went from one to two stages, while the two channel FADEC came from the TM3332E.
Then expected to enter service in 2005, its estimated market was 1,500 engines over the first 15 years.

By July 2002, Turbomeca was ready to launch the 900 kW (1,200 hp) engine development with HAL for 11% for the ALH, then renamed Dhruv.
The Ardiden 1A was designed to for the Eurocopter EC155HP+, and the Ardiden 2K for the Agusta-Bell AB.139.
It would slot between the  Arriel and the  Makila for 5-6 t (11,000-13,250lb) medium twins.
At $500,000, it would be 40% cheaper than 900kW competitors like the Honeywell/Rolls-Royce LHTEC CTS800 and the MTU/Turbomeca/R-R MTR390.
The first test run was then expected in early 2004, flight-testing by the end of the same year, certification by the end of 2005 and
entry into service by 2006.
It was launched in February 2003 at the Aero India show with a large order from HAL, to be used in 6-6.5 t (13,200-14,300lb) helicopters.
HAL was to supply one-tenth of its components.

By October 2005, Turbomeca ran the first example in Tarbes, planning a July 2006 first flight.
HAL has an 11% stake in development and 21% of the manufacture: the gearbox, power turbine and part of the  compressor.
The design include the single-crystal HP turbine blades and new ceramic coatings to run without cooling, for 20% of growth potential.

Developed by India for 19%, the Shakti made its first test flight on the Dhruv on 16 August 2007. By late 2007, HAL started fitting the Shakti for Dhruvs produced from then.

The Ardiden 3G was certified in June 2017 and by 2018, 250 Ardiden 1 were in service.
By September 2019, the Ardiden 1 engines had completed 200,000 flying hours, and the Ardiden 3C/3G had completed over 10,000 hours of tests.

Turboprop version 

By April 2019, Safran was considering a turboprop version of the Ardiden to compete with the Pratt & Whitney Canada PT6 and General Electric Catalyst, based on its Tech-TP demonstrator, part of the EU's Clean Sky 2 programme, for first ground runs in the coming months.
The first ground run happened on 12 June in Tarnos; the complete propulsion system include the nacelle, air intake and propeller while the accessory gearbox and propeller controller include more electric technologies.

It could be used for a future European UAV, in cooperation with ZF Luftfahrttechnik for the gearbox and MT-Propeller for the propeller.
The FADEC would manage both power and propeller pitch for operation up to 13,716 meters / 45,000 ft.
The Tech TP compact, lightweight architecture targets a 15% lower fuel consumption over current engines.
On 21 July 2020, a memorandum of agreement was signed between Safran and ZF, targeting flight testing of the 1,700-2,000shp (1,260-1,490kW) Ardiden 3TP from 2022.
The 11 t EuroMALE UAV, set for a 2024 first flight, is a goal as a first platform, before civil applications.

Design
The Ardiden 1 offers  and the Ardiden 3 covers the  range, for  single and twin-engine helicopters.

The Ardiden has a two-stage centrifugal compressor, then a reverse flow annular combustor, a single stage axial gas generator turbine followed by a two-stage axial free turbine outputting its power to the front by a concentric shaft, and is controlled by a dual-channel digital engine electronic control unit.

Variants and applications

Specifications

See also

References

External links 

 

Ardiden
2000s turboshaft engines